Ashton-under-Lyne railway station serves the town of Ashton-under-Lyne, in Greater Manchester, England.  It lies on the Huddersfield Line 6½ miles (10 km) east of Manchester Victoria and is operated by Northern Trains.

History 

The station, known originally as Ashton, was opened by the Ashton, Stalybridge & Liverpool Junction Railway (AS&LJR) on 13 April 1846. The AS&LJR was absorbed by the Manchester & Leeds Railway in 1847, which was then renamed the Lancashire & Yorkshire Railway (LYR). The LYR renamed it Ashton (Charlestown) in 1874. The LYR amalgamated with the London & North Western Railway at the start of 1922, and these in turn amalgamated with several other companies on 1 January 1923, to form the London, Midland & Scottish Railway during the 1923 Grouping. It then passed to the London Midland Region of British Railways on nationalisation in 1948. It was renamed Ashton-under-Lyne on 6 May 1968.

When Sectorisation was introduced in the 1980s, the station was served by Regional Railways
under arrangement with the Greater Manchester PTE until the privatisation of British Rail. Usage at this time was relatively low and trains called only rarely (see BR timetable 1974, 1975 et seq.). The train service was not regular and in essence operated at peak times only.

Other stations in Ashton

There were once three stations in the town: Charlestown, Park Parade and Oldham Road. Also, Guide Bridge, a few miles away, was known as Ashton & Hooley Hill and then Ashton in its earliest years.

Charlestown Station — the present Ashton-under-Lyne station — was owned by the Lancashire & Yorkshire Railway, who ran services between Manchester Victoria and Stalybridge. The London & North Western Railway also ran services along the line, most only calling at Ashton and Stalybridge before continuing to Leeds. The station once sported a large booking hall, where the car park is currently, as well as a substantial canopy.

Park Parade Station was located on the Guide Bridge–Stalybridge line; the only remains of the station is the "Station Inn", a short stroll away.

Oldham Road Station was located on the line to Oldham (originally owned by the Oldham, Ashton and Guide Bridge Railway), which continued to Park Bridge before reaching Clegg Street, Oldham.

Facilities 

Ashton-under-Lyne station consists of a single island platform, accessible via a ramp from the underpass at street level, it is wheelchair accessible and also has a passenger lift. This was installed due to the 1-in-8 gradient between street level and platform level Facilities of the station include a waiting room, ticket desk, wheelchair-accessible toilet and a hot-drinks vending machine.

A 3-week engineering blockade in July 2017 saw the track through the station re-aligned and a road underbridge replaced to allow for faster line speeds.  Replacement buses were provided, with through trains diverted or terminating short at Stalybridge.

Services 
The typical off-peak service from the station is:
2tph (trains per hour) to 
2tph to 

On Sundays, 1tph runs in both directions.

Gallery

References 

 
 The Manchester and Leeds Railway by Martin Bairstow
 The Lancashire & Yorkshire Railway Society, LYR Branchiline 14 - "The Ashton and Stalybridge Branch", by Robert F Hartley.

External links 

 "SERIOUS CHARGE AGAINST BOYS AT ASHTON": Placing Obstructions on the Railway" (news story from 1901, describing vandalism at Oldham Road)

Railway stations in Tameside
DfT Category E stations
Former Lancashire and Yorkshire Railway stations
Railway stations in Great Britain opened in 1846
Northern franchise railway stations
Buildings and structures in Ashton-under-Lyne
1846 establishments in England